Dávid Szabó (born 13 January 1990) is a Hungarian volleyball player. Szabo was the last member of Sisley Volley, the most titled club in Italian volleyball history, where he played from 2010 to 2012. Szabo moved to Austrian club Tirol Innsbruck in 2012 when Sisley Treviso went bankrupt and placed in the fourth level Serie B2. After playing the 2013–14 season for Trentino Volley in Italian Serie A1, Szabo played for Woori Card Hansae in South Korean V-League in 2015.

External links
 
 Dàvid Szabo at Lega Pallavolo Serie A

1990 births
Living people
Hungarian men's volleyball players